Temuraga,Tamour agha (Թամուր աղա), is a form of the Anatolian folk dance bar (dance) or Kasik Havasi.Temuraga is a folk dance spread all over Eastern Anatolia Region. There are similar folkloric dance tunes known as Çek deveci develeri engine  in the Burdur.

Versions

Bir Dilim İki Dilim Üç Dilim Elma
The original form of the  halay or Kaşık Havası was popular folk dance in İspir Erzurum.

Bir dilim iki dilim üç dilim elma
Gel sarıl boynuma almazsan alma

Eller biz de gittik vay delik taşa
Şimdiki rağbet kızlar vay kalem kaşa

Bir dilim iki dilim üç dilim elma
Gel sarıl boynuma almazsan alma

Eller biz de gittik vay ak pınara
Şimdiki rağbet kızlar vay çapkınlara

Bir dilim iki dilim üç dilim elma
Gel sarıl boynuma almazsan alma

Eller biz de gittik vay biberliğe
Şimdiki rağbet kızlar vay dilberliğe

Bir dilim iki dilim üç dilim elma
Gel sarıl boynuma almazsan alma

References 

Azerbaijani dances
Turkish dances
Armenian dances
Turkish songs
Year of song unknown
Songwriter unknown